The 2013 Oregon Challenger was a professional tennis tournament played on outdoor hard courts. It was the first edition of the tournament which was part of the 2013 ITF Women's Circuit, offering a total of $50,000 in prize money. It took place in Portland, Oregon, United States, on July 15–21, 2013.

WTA entrants

Seeds 

 1 Rankings as of July 8, 2013

Other entrants 
The following players received wildcards into the singles main draw:
  Krista Hardebeck
  Jamie Loeb

The following players received entry from the qualifying draw:
  Elizabeth Lumpkin
  Brianna Morgan
  Sally Peers
  Natalie Pluskota

The following player received entry into the singles main draw as a lucky loser:
  Nicole Melichar

Champions

Women's singles 

  Kurumi Nara def.  Alison Riske 3–6, 6–3, 6–3

Women's doubles 

  Irina Falconi /  Nicole Melichar def.  Sanaz Marand /  Ashley Weinhold 4–6, 6–3, [10–8]

External links 
 
 2013 Oregon Challenger at ITFtennis.com

2013 ITF Women's Circuit
Hard court tennis tournaments
Sports in Portland, Oregon